Paul Gorguloff, originally Pavel Timofeyevich Gorgulov (June 29, 1895 – September 14, 1932), was a Russian émigré and assassin who shot and fatally wounded the French President Paul Doumer at a book fair at the Hôtel Salomon de Rothschild in Paris on May 6, 1932.

Early life
Gorguloff was born in Labinskaya in the Kuban region of Russia. He studied medicine before he served in the First World War in which he was badly wounded in the head. During the Russian Revolution of 1917, he served with the White Russian Army against the Bolsheviks, before emigrating to Prague in Czechoslovakia, where he completed his studies. He was later expelled from Czechoslovakia for practising abortion, which was then illegal.

He moved to Paris and then to Nice, where in 1931, he was again found to be committing illegal medical acts and was threatened with expulsion. He applied for a permit to live in Monaco, which was accepted, and he lived there until 4 May 1932.

Ideology 
Gorguloff followed an esoteric set of beliefs revolving around an idealized version of the ancient Scythian culture of the steppes, agrarianism, and ultranationalism. Most knowledge of Gorguloff's ideology stems from his writings when he was in Paris. One of these writings, The National Peasant's, outlines his ideal system of government for Russia: a totalitarian rule under a hyper-militarized Green party. This state would be led by a "green dictator", similar to the Nazi concept of the Führerprinzip. Gorguloff was an emphatic supporter of fascism. His last book, which police found when arresting him, was entitled “Memoirs of Dr. Pavel Gorgulov, Supreme Chairman of the Political Party of Russian Fascists, Who Killed the President of the Republic”. Gorgulov was an outspoken Russian Supremacist, and believed that all non-Russians and non-orthodox Christians, especially Jews, should not be citizens. To this end, Gorguloff was a firm believer in the Judeo-Bolshevik conspiracy theory. Despite his fervent anti-socialism, Gorguloff despised both monarchism and Free-Market capitalism, which he viewed as anti-peasant. In much of his poetry, he reminisces about the "wild" and "barbarian" Russia, which he believes to be the successor of Scythian civilization. Gorguloff believed it was Russia's duty as the torch bearer of "primitive spirituality" to defeat western civilization, which he saw as decadent and modern, as opposed to Russia's traditional and agrarian nature.

Assassination of Paul Doumer
On May 6, 1932, a book fair was being held at the Hôtel Salomon de Rothschild in Paris, and the President of France, Paul Doumer, was present.

Gorguloff arrived at the hotel concealing a Browning FN Model 1910 gun.  He then approached the President from behind, pulled out his gun and fired three shots.  Two of them hit the President, one in the back of the head and the other in the right armpit.  The President fell to the floor.  He was rushed to the Beaujon Hospital in Paris but died the next day.  One of the authors at the exhibition, Claude Farrère, managed to wrestle with Gorguloff until the police arrived.  Gorguloff's motive for the murder was that he believed that France had failed to support the White Movement in Russia against Bolshevism. 

Gorguloff was arrested and brought to trial at the Assize Court on 25 July 1932. He was noted for his unusual behavior on trial ranging from frequent interruptions of other people's testimonies to bizarre claims like that he had planned trips to the moon, and even that he was the kidnapper of the Lindbergh Baby. Nevertheless, two days later, after rejecting the idea that he was insane, the jury condemned Gorguloff to death. On 20 August, the Court of Cassation, France's final appeal court, rejected a defence of insanity. On 14 September, Gorguloff was executed at La Santé prison in Paris by guillotine. His last words were "Россия, моя страна!" ("Russia, my country!"). He was buried at Ivry Cemetery.

The gun used in the assassination is now in the Musée des Collections Historiques de la Préfecture de Police in Paris.

References

External links

Gorguloff at peoples.ru 

1895 births
1932 deaths
1932 murders in France
Executed assassins
French assassins
People executed by the French Third Republic
People convicted of murder by France
Assassins of presidents
Executed French people
People executed by France by guillotine
Executed people from Krasnodar Krai
White Russian emigrants to Czechoslovakia
Czechoslovak emigrants to France
Burials at Ivry Cemetery